John William Bews (16 December 1884 — 10 November 1938) was a Scottish born South African botanist.

Early life
Bews was born in Kirkwall on the Orkney Islands of Scotland. His parents were farmers. He did his schooling in Kirkwall and later studied mathematics, natural philosophy, chemistry, geology, Latin, English and logic at Edinburgh University. He took a second degree in botany, chemistry and geology in 1907.

Botanical work
In 1909 Bews was appointed professor of botany and geology at the newly established Natal University College in Pietermaritzburg, South Africa. Originally intending to study plant physiology, the challenges of a new and under-resourced laboratory and the new (to him) vegetation of the Natal Midlands meant that he changed the direction of his study to field work.

Philosophy
Bews was a protege of General Jan Smuts and was influenced by his ideas on holism. "Botany, patriotism and the politics of national unity were bound up... Bews made this links explicit, recommending that ecologists use the language of sociology to describe relationships in the plant world".

Works

Commemoration
The Bews Herbarium on the Pietermaritzburg campus of the University of Natal is named in his honour.

References

Citations

Sources

Further reading

External links

Bews Herbarium

1938 deaths
20th-century South African botanists
Academic staff of the University of Natal
1884 births